The Thistle is an American planing sailing dinghy that was designed by Sandy Douglass as a one-design racer and first built in 1945.

Production
The design was originally built by Douglass & McLeod in the United States, but the company went out of business in 1971. Since then production has passed to several American builders, including the Clark Boat Company, W. D. Schock Corp, Northwest One Design and the current builder since 1975, Great Midwest Yacht Company. More than 4,000 boats of this design have been completed.

W. D. Schock Corp records indicate that they built 250 boats between 1959 and 1975.

Design
The Thistle is a recreational sailboat, with the earlier production models made from molded plywood and the more recent models built predominantly of fiberglass, with wood structural members and trim. The seats are a fiberglass-sandwich construction, and provide built-in flotation. It has a fractional sloop rig with aluminum spars and three spreader bars. The hull has no decks, a plumb stem and transom, a transom-hung rudder controlled by a tiller and a retractable, drum-mounted centerboard. It displaces .

The design has a Portsmouth Yardstick racing average handicap of 83.0 and is normally raced with a crew of three sailors, although it has a capacity of six people.

Operational history
By 1994 the design was being raced in more than 150 fleets.

In a 1994 review Richard Sherwood wrote, "the Thistle was influenced by English dinghy design and is similar to the International 14, another racing dinghy with a plumb bow and flat run. Originally, boats were of molded wood. Racing crew is three, but the Thistle will carry six. She will fit into a garage. The Thistle has a lot of sail and a lot of speed. Class rules are strict. Gear that may be technically legal but provides an advantage is not allowed ... The Thistle is the boat used as the primary yardstick for Portsmouth Numbers."

Racing

See also
List of sailing boat types

Similar sailboats
International 14

References

External links

Thistle (dinghy)